Selenophorus aeneopiceus is a species of ground beetle in the family Carabidae. It is found in North America.

References

Further reading

 

Harpalinae
Beetles of North America
Beetles described in 1884
Taxa named by Thomas Lincoln Casey Jr.
Articles created by Qbugbot